Lasiocarpus is a genus of flowering plants belonging to the family Malpighiaceae.

Its native range is Mexico.

Species
Species:

Lasiocarpus ferrugineus 
Lasiocarpus ovalifolius 
Lasiocarpus salicifolius

References

Malpighiaceae
Malpighiaceae genera